The Purple Flower by Marita Bonner, is a one-act play typically considered to be Bonner's masterpiece. Not set in any specific place or time, it is a metaphor for racial issues in the U.S. Bonner was born on June 16, 1899, in Boston, Massachusetts. She had short stories and essays published in Opportunity: A Journal of Negro Life and The Crisis magazine. She became an important literary figure in the Harlem Renaissance era which is the root of her writing inspiration. The Purple Flower was first published in The Crisis in 1928. This play is an allegory for racism and sexism against black women. This play was never performed in Bonner's lifetime.

Characters 
 Sundry White Devils- Angel-like beings, except for their glowing red horns. Artful creatures with specific and intricate movements and actions.
 The Us's- "Either as white as the white devils, brown as the earth, or as black as the center of the poppy."
 Another Us
 Another Young Us
 Average
 Cornerstone
 First Young Us
 The Grass Chewer
 The Man of the Gold Bags
 The Middle-Aged Woman
 The Newcomer
 An Old Lady
 An Old Man
 Young Girl
 Young Man
 Young Girl- Sweet
 The Young- Man Finest Blood

Plot summary 
The White Devils live on the hill where the purple flower of life grows. The Us's worked to build the town on the hill but are forced to live in the valley below, treated as outsiders. They spend their time figuring out how to get back up the hill while the White Devils try to keep them away, the White Devils do not want the Us's living amongst them. The play begins in the evening as the Us's listen to the White Devils singing on the hillside, they are singing to the Us's to stay where they are. The Us's discuss their dreams of finally getting to see the purple flower. An Old Lady claims that the "Leader" told them if they work hard enough for the White Devils, they can prove themselves. However, after two hundred years of slavery, the White Devils have still deemed them unworthy and they realize they have got nowhere.

The Us's decide to have a meeting to discuss how to get up the hill but Average complains that talking will not accomplish anything. His daughter and son, Sweet and Finest Blood, volunteer to talk at the meeting. An Old Us joins the group, beating on a drum while the other Us's stand up and begin to dance. They can see the purple flower at the top of the hill. The Young Us's say that they have been told all of their life to work hard, but it has gotten them nowhere. A Young Man tosses books to the ground saying that even books cannot tell them how to overcome the White Devils because the books were written by the White Devils. Sweet comes running out of the bushes and says that a White Devil was hiding there and pinched her. A Newcomer joins the group, dropping two bags of gold on the ground. He claims that this money does nothing for him while the White Devils do not allow him to get anywhere with it.

In the end, the Old Man asks for an iron pot and begins calling upon the Old Us's and their ancestors. Ten million Us's respond and asks for a handful of dust, books, and gold which he receives and throws into the pot. Finally, he asks for blood, and the Us's are silent. Finest Blood steps forward to offer his blood, and then Cornerstone offers hers. The Old Man explains that by mixing these things together, God will shape a new man.  Finest Blood is given the task of going up the hill to fight the White Devils. The final stage directions read "Let the curtain close leaving all the Us's, the White Devils, Nowhere, Somewhere, listening, listening. Is it time?".

References 

1928 plays
African-American plays
One-act plays